Richard Warner (September 19, 1835 – March 4, 1915) was a U.S. Representative from Tennessee.

Biography
Born near Chapel Hill, Tennessee, Warner attended the public schools and graduated from Cumberland School of Law at Cumberland University, Lebanon, Tennessee, in 1858. He was admitted to the bar the same year and commenced practice in Lewisburg, Tennessee.

Career
Warner served in the Confederate States Army from 1861-1865 and, after the end of the Civil War, returned to Lewisburg, Tennessee to resume the practice of law. He served as delegate to the convention that framed the new constitution of Tennessee in 1870 and served as member of the state house of representatives from 1879 to 1881.

Elected as a Democrat to the Forty-seventh and Forty-eighth Congresses, Warner served from March 4, 1881 to March 3, 1885.  He served as chairman of the Committee on Mines and Mining (Forty-eighth Congress). He was an unsuccessful candidate for renomination in 1884, and resumed the practice of law in Lewisburg, Tennessee.

Death
Warner died in Nashville, Tennessee, March 4, 1915 and is interred at Warner Cemetery, near Chapel Hill, Tennessee.

References

External links

1835 births
1915 deaths
People from Chapel Hill, Tennessee
People of Tennessee in the American Civil War
Confederate States Army personnel
Democratic Party members of the United States House of Representatives from Tennessee
19th-century American politicians
People from Lewisburg, Tennessee